James Dundas-Grant KBE, MD, FRCSEd, FRCS (13 June 1854  – 13 November 1944) was a British ear, nose and throat surgeon. He was surgeon to a number of London hospitals and surgeon to several institutions. He was regarded as a prolific writer about  a variety of topics within his speciality and devised a number of surgical instruments. In addition to his clinical practice he was president of several surgical  speciality societies and was knighted in 1920.

Early life 
James Dundas-Grant was born in Edinburgh in 1854. His father was James Dundas-Grant, an Edinburgh advocate and his mother Louise Elizabeth Dundas-Grant (née Chapuy). He went to school at the Edinburgh Academy and finished his schooling at Dunkirk College in northern France. He matriculated as an undergraduate at the University of Edinburgh graduating Master of Arts (MA) in 1873. He then studied for a short time at the University of Würzburg in Bavaria before matriculating in the University of Edinburgh Medical School graduating MB CM in 1876. He was a house officer at the Edinburgh Royal Maternity Hospital then  went on to set up in general practice in London. He had hospital attachments to Poplar Hospital and the Shadwell Lying-in Home and was able to attend clinics at London teaching hospitals, where his interest in oto-laryngology began. He graduated MD with honours from the University of Edinburgh in 1879. His first post in his chosen speciality was as a surgical registrar at the Central London Nose, Throat, and Ear Hospital (later the Royal National Throat, Nose and Ear Hospital).

Surgical career 
Dundas-Grant became pathologist and then surgeon at the Central London Nose, Throat, and Ear Hospital. He became a Fellow of the Royal College of Surgeons of Edinburgh (FRCSEd) in 1884 and of the Royal College of Surgeons of England six years later. He was also surgeon to the Brompton Hospital, the West End Hospital for Neurology and Neurosurgery, the Freemasons' Hospital and the Sussex Throat and Ear Hospital at Brighton. During WWI he was oto-laryngologist to several military hospitals including the King George Military Hospital, Lord Knutsford's Hospitals and the Russian Hospital for Officers. He also served as a surgeon-major in the reserve regiment the 24th Middlesex (Post Office) Rifle Volunteers and was medical officer to the London division of the National Reserve Corps.

He was a prolific writer contributing articles on a wide range of topics within his speciality. His knowledge of the specialty was regarded by colleagues as encyclopaedic.  He had a particular panache for devising surgical  instruments, several of which were widely used. Dundas-Grant was also an irregular attender of the Inklings, an informal literary discussion group associated with the University of Oxford attended by C.S. Lewis and J.R.R. Tolkien, which met for nearly two decades between the early 1930s and late 1949.

Dundas-Grant had a lifelong passion for music and was surgeon to the Royal Academy of Music and aural surgeon to the Royal Society of Musicians. A favourite pastime was conducting an orchestra which he had formed.

In 1917 he was made director of the aural clinics of the Ministry of Pensions and was appointed senior consultant to the ministry.

Honours and awards 
Dundas-Grant was a vice-president of the Royal Institution, president of the Section of Laryngology of the Royal Society of Medicine, president of the Section of Laryngology and Otology of the British Medical Association and president of the Hunterian Society. He was made an honorary member of specialist societies in France, Belgium, Germany and the United States. He was made a Knight Commander of the Order of the British Empire (KBE) in the 1920 Birthday Honours.

Family 
He married Helen Frith in 1890. They had two sons.

Later life and death 
A street accident in 1944 took its toll on his health and he died in London on 13 November 1944.

Selected publications 

 Labyrinth tests. Medical Press  (1922), 103, 501.
 Enlarged tonsils and adenoids. West London Medical Journal. (1924), 29, 1.
 Catarrhal deafness. Practitioner, (1925), 64, 385.
 Tuberculosis and cancer of the larynx. Clinical Journal. (1925), 54, 469.
 Aphonia of Forty-four Years' Duration caused by Inhalation of a Stud, requiring Tracheotomy: Proc R Soc Med. 1934 Jul;27(9):1275.  
 Simplified Method of Determining Percentage of Actual Hearing-power in Tuning-fork Tests Proc R Soc Med. 1934 Feb;27(4):419-24. 
 Forcible nasal inspiration Br Med J. 1933 Feb 4;1(3761):183-4.
 Carcinoma of Right Vocal Cord removed by Laryngofissure. Proc R Soc Med. 1931 Jun;24(8):1033-4.

References 

1854 births
1944 deaths
Medical doctors from Edinburgh
Alumni of the University of Edinburgh
People educated at Edinburgh Academy
Alumni of the University of Edinburgh Medical School
Fellows of the Royal College of Surgeons of Edinburgh
Fellows of the Royal College of Surgeons
Knights Commander of the Order of the British Empire
19th-century surgeons